Dalgodeltsi (also transliterated as Dulgodeltsi or Dŭlgodeltsi) is a village (село) in northwestern Bulgaria, located in the Yakimovo Municipality of the Montana Province.

See also
List of villages in Montana Province

References

Villages in Montana Province